The Sporting News Rookie of the Year Award is an annual Major League Baseball (MLB) award established in 1946 by Sporting News. For the first three years (1946–1948) and again in 1950, there was a single award. In 1949 and since 1951, the award has been given to a rookie from both the American League and National League. In 1961 and from 1963 through 2003, Sporting News split the rookie award into two separate categories, Rookie Pitcher of the Year and Rookie Player of the Year (in each league). In 2004 those two awards were discontinued, in favor of a single award, one for each league.

Below is a list of winners by year, name, team, league, and position.

1946–1949
1946	
Del Ennis (Philadelphia NL, OF)
1947
Jackie Robinson (Brooklyn NL, 1B)
1948
Richie Ashburn (Philadelphia NL, OF)
1949
Roy Sievers (St. Louis AL, OF)
Don Newcombe (Brooklyn NL, P)

1950-1959

1950	
Whitey Ford (New York AL,	P)
1951
Minnie Miñoso (Chicago AL, OF)	
Willie Mays (New York NL, OF)
1952
Clint Courtney (St. Louis	AL, C)	
Joe Black (Brooklyn NL, P)
1953	
Harvey Kuenn (Detroit AL, SS)	
Jim Gilliam (Brooklyn NL, 2B)
1954	
Bob Grim (New York AL, P)	
Wally Moon (St. Louis NL, OF)
1955	
Herb Score (Cleveland AL, P)	
Bill Virdon (St. Louis NL, OF)
1956
Luis Aparicio (Chicago AL, SS)	
Frank Robinson (Cincinnati NL, OF)
1957	
Tony Kubek (New York AL, IF-OF) 	
Ed Bouchee (Philadelphia AL, 1B)
Jack Sanford (Philadelphia NL, P)
1958
Ryne Duren (New York AL, P)
Albie Pearson (Washington	AL, OF)
Orlando Cepeda (San Francisco NL, 1B)
Carlton Willey (Milwaukee NL, P)
1959
Bob Allison (Washington AL, OF)	
Willie McCovey (San Francisco NL, 1B)

1960–1969

1960
Ron Hansen (Baltimore AL, SS)	
Frank Howard (Los Angeles	NL, OF)
1961	
Dick Howser (Kansas City AL, SS)
Don Schwall (Boston AL, P)
Ken Hunt (Cincinnati NL, P)
Billy Williams (Chicago	NL, OF)
1962
Tom Tresh (New York AL, OF-SS)	
Ken Hubbs (Chicago NL, 2B)
1963
Gary Peters (Chicago AL, P)
Pete Ward (Chicago AL, 3B)	
Ray Culp (Philadelphia NL, P)
Pete Rose (Cincinnati NL, 2B)
1964
Wally Bunker (Baltimore AL, P)
Tony Oliva (Minnesota AL, OF)	
Billy McCool (Cincinnati NL, P)
Dick Allen (Philadelphia NL, 3B)
1965
Marcelino López (California AL, P)
Curt Blefary (Baltimore AL, OF)	
Frank Linzy (San Francisco NL, P)
Joe Morgan (Houston NL, 2B)
1966
Jim Nash (Kansas City AL, P)
Tommie Agee (Chicago AL, OF)
Don Sutton (Los Angeles NL, P)	
Tommy Helms (Cincinnati NL, 3B)
1967
Tom Phoebus (Baltimore AL, P)
Rod Carew (Minnesota AL, 2B)
Dick Hughes (St. Louis NL, P)
Lee May (Cincinnati NL, 1B)
1968	
Stan Bahnsen (New York AL, P)
Del Unser (Washington AL, OF)
Jerry Koosman (New York NL, P)	
Johnny Bench (Cincinnati NL, C)
1969
Mike Nagy (Boston AL, P)
Carlos May (Chicago AL, OF)
Tom Griffin (Houston NL, P)	
Coco Laboy (Montreal NL, 2B)

1970–1979

1970
Bert Blyleven (Minnesota AL, P)
Roy Foster (Cleveland AL, OF)
Carl Morton (Montreal NL, P)
Bernie Carbo (Cincinnati NL, OF)
1971
Bill Parsons (Milwaukee AL, P)
Chris Chambliss (Cleveland AL, 1B)	
Reggie Cleveland (St. Louis NL, P)
Earl Williams (Atlanta NL, C)
1972
Dick Tidrow (Cleveland AL, P)
Carlton Fisk (Boston AL, C)	
Jon Matlack (New York NL, P)
Dave Rader (San Francisco NL, C)
1973
Steve Busby (Kansas City AL, P)
Al Bumbry (Baltimore AL, OF)	
Steve Rogers (Montreal NL, P)
Gary Matthews (San Francisco NL, OF)
1974
Frank Tanana (California AL, P)
Mike Hargrove (Texas AL, 1B)	
John D'Acquisto (San Francisco NL, P)
Greg Gross (Houston NL, OF)
1975
Dennis Eckersley (Cleveland AL, P)
Fred Lynn (Boston AL, OF)	
John Montefusco (San Francisco NL, P)
Gary Carter (Montreal NL,	OF-C)
1976
Mark Fidrych (Detroit AL, P)
Butch Wynegar (Minnesota AL, C)	
Butch Metzger (San Diego NL, P)
Larry Herndon (San Francisco NL, OF)
1977
Dave Rozema (Detroit AL, P)
Mitchell Page (Oakland AL, OF)	
Bob Owchinko (San Diego NL, P)
Andre Dawson (Montreal NL, OF)
1978	
Rich Gale (Kansas City AL, P)
Paul Molitor (Milwaukee AL, 2B)	
Don Robinson (Pittsburgh NL, P)
Bob Horner (Atlanta NL, 3B)
1979
Mark Clear (California AL, P)
Pat Putnam (Texas AL, 1B)	
Rick Sutcliffe (Los Angeles NL, P)
Jeffrey Leonard (Houston NL, OF)

1980–1989

1980
Britt Burns (Chicago AL, P)
Joe Charboneau (Cleveland AL, OF)	
Bill Gullickson (Montreal NL, P)
Lonnie Smith, (Philadelphia NL, OF)
1981
Dave Righetti (New York AL, P)
Rich Gedman (Boston AL, C)
Fernando Valenzuela (Los Angeles NL, P)
Tim Raines (Montreal NL, OF)
1982
Ed Vande Berg (Seattle AL, P)
Cal Ripken Jr. (Baltimore AL, SS-3B)	
Steve Bedrosian (Atlanta NL, P)
Johnny Ray (Pittsburgh NL, 2B)
1983
Mike Boddicker (Baltimore AL, P)
Ron Kittle (Chicago AL, OF) 	
Craig McMurtry (Atlanta NL, P)
Darryl Strawberry (New York NL, OF)
1984	
Mark Langston (Seattle AL, P)
Alvin Davis (Seattle AL, 1B)
Dwight Gooden (New York NL, P)
Juan Samuel (Philadelphia NL, 2B)
1985
Teddy Higuera (Milwaukee AL, P)
Ozzie Guillén (Chicago AL, SS)	
Tom Browning (Cincinnati NL, P)
Vince Coleman (St. Louis NL, OF)
1986
Mark Eichhorn (Toronto AL, P)
José Canseco (Oakland AL, OF)	
Todd Worrell (St. Louis NL, P)
Robby Thompson (San Francisco NL,	2B)
1987
Mike Henneman (Detroit AL, P)
Mark McGwire (Oakland AL,	1B)	
Mike Dunne (Pittsburgh NL, P)
Benito Santiago (San Diego NL, C)
1988
Bryan Harvey (California AL, P)
Walt Weiss (Oakland AL, SS)	
Tim Belcher (Los Angeles NL, P)
Mark Grace (Chicago NL, 1B)
1989	
Tom Gordon (Kansas City AL, P)
Craig Worthington (Baltimore AL, 3B)	
Andy Benes (San Diego NL, P)
Jerome Walton (Chicago NL, OF)

1990–1999

1990
Kevin Appier (Kansas City AL, P)
Sandy Alomar (Cleveland AL, C)
Mike Harkey (Chicago NL, P)
David Justice (Atlanta NL, OF)
1991
Juan Guzmán (Toronto AL, P)
Chuck Knoblauch (Minnesota AL, 2B)	
Al Osuna (Houston NL, P)
Jeff Bagwell (Houston NL,	1B)
1992
Cal Eldred (Milwaukee AL, P)
Pat Listach (Milwaukee AL, SS)
Tim Wakefield (Pittsburgh NL, P)
Eric Karros (Los Angeles NL, 1B)
1993	
Aaron Sele (Boston AL, P)
Tim Salmon (California AL, OF)	
Kirk Rueter (Montreal NL, P)
Mike Piazza (Los Angeles NL, C)
1994
Brian Anderson (California AL, P)
Bob Hamelin (Kansas City AL, DH)	
Steve Trachsel (Chicago NL, P)
Raúl Mondesí (Los Angeles NL, OF)
1995
Julián Tavárez (Cleveland AL, P)
Garret Anderson (California AL, OF)
Hideo Nomo (Los Angeles NL, P)
Chipper Jones (Atlanta NL, 3B)
1996
James Baldwin (Chicago AL, P)
Derek Jeter (New York AL, SS)	
Alan Benes (St. Louis NL, P)
Jason Kendall (Pittsburgh NL, C)
1997
Jason Dickson (Anaheim AL, P)
Nomar Garciaparra (Boston AL, SS)	
Matt Morris (St. Louis NL, P)
Scott Rolen (Philadelphia NL, 3B)
1998
Rolando Arrojo (Tampa Bay AL, P)
Ben Grieve (Oakland AL, OF)
Kerry Wood (Chicago NL, P)
Todd Helton (Colorado NL, 1B)
1999
Tim Hudson (Oakland AL, P)
Carlos Beltrán (Kansas City AL, OF)	
Scott Williamson (Cincinnati NL, P)
Preston Wilson (Florida NL, OF)

2000–2009

2000
Kazuhiro Sasaki (Seattle AL, P)
Mark Quinn (Kansas City AL, OF)	
Rick Ankiel (St. Louis NL, P)
Rafael Furcal (Atlanta NL, SS)
2001
CC Sabathia (Cleveland AL, P)
Ichiro Suzuki (Seattle AL, OF) 	
Roy Oswalt (Houston NL, P)
Albert Pujols (St. Louis NL, 3B)
2002
Rodrigo López (Baltimore AL, P)
Eric Hinske (Toronto AL, 3B)	
Jason Jennings (Colorado NL, P)
Brad Wilkerson (Montreal NL, OF)
2003
Rafael Soriano (Seattle AL, P)
Jody Gerut (Cleveland AL,	OF)	
Dontrelle Willis (Florida NL, P)
Scott Podsednik (Milwaukee NL, OF)
2004
Bobby Crosby (Oakland AL, SS)
Jason Bay (Pittsburgh NL, OF)
2005
Huston Street (Oakland AL, RP)
Willy Taveras (Houston NL, OF)
2006
Justin Verlander (Detroit AL, P)
Hanley Ramírez (Florida NL, SS)
2007
Dustin Pedroia (Boston AL, 2B)
Ryan Braun (Milwaukee NL, 3B)
2008
Evan Longoria (Tampa Bay AL, 3B)
Geovany Soto (Chicago NL, C)
2009
Andrew Bailey (Oakland AL, P)
J. A. Happ (Philadelphia NL, P)

2010–2019

2010
Austin Jackson (Detroit AL, OF)
Jason Heyward (Atlanta NL, OF)
2011
Mark Trumbo (Los Angeles AL, 1B)
Craig Kimbrel (Atlanta NL, P)
2012
Mike Trout (Los Angeles AL, OF)
Wade Miley (Arizona NL, P)
2013
Wil Myers (Tampa Bay AL, OF)
José Fernández (Miami NL, P)
2014
José Abreu (Chicago AL, 1B)
Jacob deGrom (New York NL, P)
2015
Carlos Correa (Houston AL, SS)
Kris Bryant (Chicago NL, 3B)
2016
Michael Fulmer (Detroit AL, P)
Corey Seager (Los Angeles NL, SS)
2017
Aaron Judge (New York AL, OF)
Cody Bellinger (Los Angeles NL, 1B/OF)
2018
Shohei Ohtani (Los Angeles AL, P/DH)
Ronald Acuna (Atlanta NL, OF)
2019
Yordan Álvarez (Houston AL, OF/DH)
Pete Alonso (New York NL, 1B)

2020–Present

See also

Major League Baseball Rookie of the Year Award (in each league)
MLB Rookie of the Month Award
"Esurance MLB Awards" Best Rookie (in MLB)
"Players Choice Awards" Outstanding Rookie (in each league)
Baseball America Rookie of the Year (in MLB)

List of MLB awards
TSN Player of the Year
TSN Pitcher of the Year
TSN Reliever of the Year
TSN Comeback Player of the Year
TSN Manager of the Year
TSN Executive of the Year

References

Major League Baseball trophies and awards
Awards established in 1946
1946 establishments in the United States
Rookie player awards